Hajin (also Romanized as Hajīn and Hejīn; also known as Hechīn) is a village in Mashiz Rural District, in the Central District of Bardsir County, Kerman Province, Iran. At the 2006 census, its population was 603, in 154 families.

References 

Populated places in Bardsir County